Kara or Kada is a thick metal ring or bracelet usually worn on the hands or wrists of men and women in India. It is a religious bracelet that Sikhs wear. Mostly made of Iron, the kara has different design styles and is usually used to honor a religious figure.
Kara is worn by Sikhs who have been initiated into the Khalsa. It is one of the five kakars or five Ks — external articles of faith — that identify a Sikh as dedicated to their religious order.  The kara was instituted by the tenth Sikh guru Gobind Singh at the Baisakhi Amrit Sanchar in 1699. Guru Gobind Singh Ji explained:

Moreover, kara is also worn by the Shia sect of Islam in commemoration of their fourth Imam, Imam Zain ul abideen who was imprisoned after the tragedy of Karbala along with his family. 
The Kara is a symbol of unbreakable attachment and commitment to God. As the Sikhs' holy text the Guru Granth Sahib says "In the tenth month, you were made into a human being, O my merchant friend, and you were given your allotted time to perform good deeds." Similarly, Bhagat Kabir reminds the Sikh to always keep one's consciousness with God: "With your hands and feet, do all your work, but let your consciousness remain with the Immaculate Lord." The kara is also worn by many ethnic Punjabis and other non-Punjabi Indian families across the states in the North, North-West and West of India (such as Gujarat, Rajasthan, and Maharashtra) by Hindus.  The use of the kara by some non-Sikhs is encouraged as it represents the "totality of God" and in some Indian cultures is used to represent the coming of manhood and masculinity, as it was used in ancient times by Rajput warriors. Nowadays, irrespective of religion or its associated beliefs, many people wear kara for fashion purposes.

See also
Kara (Sikhism)

References

Rings (jewellery)
Jewellery of India
Jewellery of Pakistan